is a Japanese singer, actor and lyricist. He was also the main vocalist of Japanese male idol group Kanjani Eight, which debuted with modern enka, before he left the group in 2018. His first solo album Nisai was released in October 2019. Shibutani was already a singer in his own right before the group's debut, immensely popular among Johnny's Jr. fans as the top Kansai Jr. of his time.

Career
Shibutani entered Johnny & Associates in 1996 on his birthday, September 22 (along with future fellow Kanjani Eight member Ryūhei Maruyama) after passing an audition. He did not hear from the agency until December 1996, when he was called to a second audition for a KinKi Kids concert. It was there where he first met two other future fellow members You Yokoyama and Shingo Murakami.

Shibutani's ability to sing was acknowledged during the recording of an original Kansai Jr. song "Boys in the West Side", theme song for Kanjani Knights, a Kansai Jr. show that ran in 1998. He was a regular on the show together with Yokoyama and Murakami. The trio went on to appear on many Jr shows together, becoming close co-workers and dubbing themselves "3baka" ("the 3 idiots"). Together with Ryo Nishikido, they were dubbed the four top Kansai Jrs. This meant increased exposure, with opportunities to appear in many Jr shows in Tokyo as well. Shibutani's big break was an outstanding solo performance on Music Station which would see him move to live in Tokyo, followed shortly by Yokoyama and Murakami. At Tokyo, he received many singing jobs and the 3baka became a fixture in the Tokyo Jr TV programs; They went on to star in their own TV series, IkeIkeIkemen, and were regulars on Koichi Domoto's show Pikaichi.

Around 2000 to 2001, work offers from the agency diminished greatly for the Kansai Jrs. Out of work in Tokyo, they moved back to Osaka, and found part-time jobs to supplement their salaries.

In 2002, Johnny Kitagawa had the Kansai Jrs put on an old play previously performed by their seniors, SMAP and KinKi Kids, called Another. This marked a revival of Kansai Jr activities but Kitagawa's strategy this time was to localize the Kansai Jrs' activities and keep them based in Kansai. Shibutani returned to the stage. He also appeared on TV regularly, on J3Kansai.

In 2003, Johnny Kitagawa formed Kanjani Eight using the top Kansai Jrs. He decided to have Shibutani sing enka and debut Kanjani Eight with him as lead singer. In August 2004, the group released its first single, Naniwa Iroha Bushi, an enka song infused with rap. The single made it to No. 8 on the Oricon singles chart despite its Kansai-limited release. This was followed by a nationwide release the following month that shot Naniwa to the top of the chart. Shibutani and his fellow members learned about their official debut through the newspapers.

Kanjani Eight's songs encompass a wide range of styles besides enka and pop; rap, jazz, funk, rock-and-roll, blues, dance, ballad, and disco are among the other styles featured.
In addition, Shibutani is also the main vocalist for Kanjani Eight subgroups, SanKyoudai, an acoustic music group, and SubaruBand, a rock band. He also plays several instruments, the guitar, harmonica and shamisen.

As a Jr., Shibutani wrote several original songs in collaboration with the guitarist of Jr. band FIVE, Nakaegawa Rikiya, who composed the melodies. These songs were performed by Shibutani with FIVE. Subaru also collaborates with Kanjani8 band member, Shota Yasuda. The two write the songs for their band, SubaruBand (ONE, High Position, DownUp). He regularly writes the lyrics for his concert solos as well.

Discography

Singles
Kioku / Kokoro Odoreba (February 11, 2015)

Albums
Uta (February 10, 2016) (cover album)
Nisai (October 9, 2019)

DVDs
"Kioku ~ Shibutani Subaru / 1562" (September 16, 2015)
"Shibutani Subaru LIVE TOUR 2016 Uta" (September 21, 2016)

Solo concerts
Shibutani Subaru with Ohkura-Band (August 29, 2006 – September 17, 2006)
Five Flat Flowers (September 4–7, 2008 in Osaka, September 23, 2008 – October 6, 2008 in Tokyo)
Shibutani Subaru LIVE TOUR 2015 (January 18 – February 25, 2015, in Osaka, Fukuoka, Sapporo, Niigata, Sendai, Nagoya, Hiroshima, Kagawa, Tokyo)
Shibutani Subaru LIVE TOUR 2016 (February 18 – March 27, 2016, in Nagoya, Osaka, Fukuoka, Sapporo, Tokyo)

Filmography

Drama
1999: Shichinin no Samurai J ke no Hanran
1999: Kowai Nichiyōbi
1999: Abunai Hōkago
2001: Worst Dates in History
2001: Platonic Sex
2006: Double
2008: Arigatō, Okan
2012: Papa wa Idol

Movie
2010: 8uppers
2012: Eight Ranger
2014: Eight Ranger 2
2015: La La La at Rock Bottom

Stage
1997: Kyo To Kyo
1998: Mask
1998: Kyo To Kyo
2000: Millennium Shock
2002: Another
2003: Dōton Boys
2004: Summer Storm
2005: Never Gonna Dance
2005: Hey! Say! Dream Boy
2005: Magical Summer
2005: Dream Boys
2006: Another's Another
2006: Dream Boys
2009: Dream Boys

References

Japanese male actors
Japanese idols
Living people
Kanjani Eight members
1981 births
People from Ibaraki, Osaka
Musicians from Osaka Prefecture